The Michel II Government was the Federal Government of Belgium, led by Prime Minister Charles Michel from 18 December 2018 until 27 October 2019 when it was succeeded by the Wilmès I Government. It was a centre minority coalition cabinet of Christian Democratic and Flemish (CD&V), the Open Flemish Liberals and Democrats (Open Vld) and the Reformist Movement (MR). On 26 October 2019, it was announced that Sophie Wilmès would take over the role of Prime Minister from Michel on 1 November 2019, and form a new government.

History 
The government came into existence on 9 December 2018 following the exit of New Flemish Alliance (N-VA) from the Michel I Government. As the Prime Minister did not offer the government's resignation to the King until the 18th, it is constitutionally still the same government as the one that started in 2014, albeit a heavily reshuffled government following the resignation of all N-VA ministers and secretaries of state. Politically, however, it is in an entirely different situation, as it has no support from N-VA and thus operates as a new government.

On 10 December, several parties had called for the government to propose a motion of confidence.

Michel attempted to continue with the minority cabinet with support from the centre-left opposition, who instead announced on 18 December that they would submit a motion of no confidence against the cabinet.

On 18 December, Premier Michel offered his resignation to King Philippe.

On 20 December, the Chamber of Representatives almost unanimously voted a draft budget to enable provisional spending for the first three months of 2019 based on the 2018 budget.

The King accepted Michel's resignation on 21 December after consulting party leaders. The outgoing cabinet continues governing as a caretaker government, likely until after the European Parliament, Belgian regional and federal elections of 26 May 2019.

On 2 July 2019, Prime Minister Charles Michel was elected to become the next President of the European Council as from 1 December 2019. With no new government formed, Sophie Wilmès was appointed to take over the role of Prime Minister from 27 October 2019, to allow Charles Michel sufficient time to prepare for his role as President of the European Council.

Composition

Changes in composition
 On June 25, 2019, one month after the 2019 European Parliament elections, Kris Peeters offered his resignation as Deputy Prime Minister and Minister of Consumer Affairs, Disabled Persons, Economy, Employment, Equal Rights and Fighting Poverty to take up his seat in the European Parliament, with CD&V appointing party president Wouter Beke as his replacement two days later, with the exception that the role of Deputy Minister shifted to Koen Geens.
 On October 2, 2019, Wouter Beke was in turn replaced by Nathalie Muylle as Beke took up the position as Flemish Minister for Welfare in the Flemish Government.

References

Belgian governments
2018 establishments in Belgium
Cabinets established in 2018